The 2010 Copa Caixa Stock Car season was the 32nd Stock Car Brasil season. It began on March 28 at Interlagos and ended on December 5 at Curitiba after twelve rounds.

Max Wilson won the Drivers' Championship by thirteen points from Cacá Bueno, Wilson team-mate Ricardo Mauricio and Allam Khodair finished in third.

Teams and drivers
All drivers were Brazilian-registered.

Race calendar and results
All races were held in Brazil.

Championship standings

Drivers' championship

References

External links
 Official website of the Stock Car Brasil (In Portuguese)

Stock Car Brasil
Stock Car Brasil seasons